Bussière-Dunoise is a commune in the Creuse department in the Nouvelle-Aquitaine region in central France.

Geography
Four small tributaries of the Creuse have their source within the commune.

Population

Sights

 The church of St. Symphorien, dating from the twelfth century.
 A memorial in stone, to French aviator, Jules Védrines, whose wife was born here.

See also
Communes of the Creuse department

References

Communes of Creuse